Keyghobad Zafar was an Iranian architect, and one of the founders in 1945 of the influential Association of Iranian Architects.

References

Architecture in Iran